The 1962 United States Senate election in Hawaii took place on November 6, 1962. Incumbent Democratic Senator Oren Long retired after serving an abbreviated three-year term. Democratic U.S. Representative Dan Inouye was elected to succeed Long, defeating Republican Ben Dillingham II, the heir to the massive Dillingham industrial fortune. 

Inouye would continue hold the seat with little trouble for nearly fifty years, until his death in 2012.

Democratic primary

Candidates
 Daniel Inouye, at-large U.S. Representative
 Frank Troy

Results

General election

Results

See also 
 1962 United States Senate elections

References

1962
Hawaii
United States Senate
Daniel Inouye